316 may refer to:

 The year 316
 The year 316 BC
 316 (number), the number

316 may also refer to:

In the bible
 John 3:16, a famous verse in the Christian bible

In media and entertainment
 "316" (Lost), a television episode
 Austin 3:16, catchphrase of wrestler Steve Austin based on the biblical verse
 "316", an instrumental song by Van Halen from the album For Unlawful Carnal Knowledge

In telephony
 Area code 316, encompassing the city of Wichita, Kansas and surrounding communities
 316, the prefix for a Sprint Nextel cell phone in the US 716 area code

In other uses
 Grade 316 (stainless steel) or Marine grade stainless, the second most common austenite stainless steel
 BMW 316, one of several cars made by BMW in the 3 Series